Caracara or Carcara may refer to:

Biology 
 Caracara (genus), a genus of birds with two extant species
 Caracara (subfamily), a subfamily of birds with five genera
 Cara cara navel a kind of orange

Art and entertainment 
 "Caracara" (song), a 2014 song by K.O
 "Carcará", a 1965 single by Maria Bethânia
 Caracara, original title of The Last Witness (1999 film)

Other uses 
 K'ara K'ara, an Andean mountain
 Carcará, nickname of Braulio Estima, a Brazilian martial artist
 USS Caracara (AMc-40), a U.S. Navy minesweeper
 Carcara UAV, an unmanned aerial vehicle

See also 
 Kara Kara (disambiguation)